WEBF (88.3 FM) is a K-LOVE-affiliated radio station in Lerose, Kentucky, United States. The station is owned by Hour of Harvest, Inc. and features programming from K-Love. The station is also broadcast on HD radio.

In 2006, Governor Ernie Fletcher honored the station with the Arts Broadcasting Award..

History
The station went on the air as WSPE on 8 January 1999, owned by the Owsley County Schools with studios at Owsley County High School. On 31 July 2001, the station changed its call sign to WOCS, and on 23 March 2011, the station changed its call sign again to the current WEBF.

From 2001 to 2011, then-WOCS served as a repeater for Morehead State University's NPR station, WMKY. However, in 2011, Owsley County Schools sold the station to Hour of Harvest, who then leased the station to K-LOVE.

References

External links

K-Love radio stations
Radio stations established in 1999
1999 establishments in Kentucky
EBF